Jaakko Turtiainen (born March 5, 1991) is a Finnish professional ice hockey forward who currently plays for KS Cracovia of the Polska Hokej Liga.

Turtiainen previously played in Liiga for HPK.

References

External links

1991 births
Living people
Dunaújvárosi Acélbikák players
Finnish ice hockey forwards
HPK players
MKS Cracovia (ice hockey) players
Mikkelin Jukurit players
Peliitat Heinola players
SaPKo players
Ice hockey people from Helsinki